Dean Drako  is an American businessman and entrepreneur who has started more than five companies.  Drako was founder, president and CEO of Barracuda Networks from 2003 to July 2012. Drako is currently President and CEO of Eagle Eye Networks, IC Manage and Drako Motors. He is also chairman of Brivo.

He graduated with a BS in Electrical Engineering from the University of Michigan and an MS in Electrical Engineering from UC Berkeley.  As of 2020, Drako is a holder of 53 patents, including patents on video streaming, video storage, video analytics, digital image processing, network security & protocols, digital circuits, biochemical assays, and electric automobiles.

Career history

In 1982, Drako founded his first company, which sold a bulletin board system software package called T-net, used to share messages via modems. Drako used the profits to fund his college education.

In 1992, Drako founded Design Acceleration, Inc, served as its CEO, and sold it to Cadence Design Systems in 1999.  Drako was also founder and CEO of Boldfish and Velosel; Boldfish was acquired by Siebel Systems in 2003. In 2003 Drako founded IC Manage, where he continues to be president and CEO.

Drako has written a number of articles on open source, big data, and system on chip design.

Drako is a frequently invited speaker and contributor on the topic of entrepreneurship, including by UC Berkeley, University of Michigan, ISPD, and Forbes.

Barracuda Networks

Also in 2003, Drako founded Barracuda Networks and introduced their email spam and virus appliance product line. Other Barracuda product lines launched during Drako's tenure were: web filters, load balancers, email archiving, and digital PBXs.

Drako executed six acquisitions by Barracuda Networks: In 2007, NetContinuum, an application controller company; in 2008, BitLeap, a provider of cloud-based backup services, and 3SP, an SSL and VPN company; in 2009, Yosemite Technologies, for incremental backup of applications; a controlling interest in phion AG, an Austria-based public enterprise-class firewalls company, and Purewire Inc, a software as a service (SaaS) cloud-based web filtering and security company.

Drako contributed to or supported 16 different open source projects while running Barracuda including Valgrind, Apache, and the Free Software Foundation.

Barracuda was ranked #2 by Glassdoor in 2011, with Drako receiving an 88% approval rating. Drako resigned from Barracuda Networks in July 2012 to found Eagle Eye Networks, while continuing to serve on Barracuda's board of directors until 2014. At the time of Drako’s resignation, Barracuda stated it was profitable, generating hundreds of millions in annual revenue, close to 30% year-over-year growth since inception, and had surpassed 150,000 customers.

IC Manage
In 2003, Drako also co-founded IC Manage, which provides  Design & IP Management, Big Data Analytics, and high performance computing Scale Out I/O & Cloud Bursting software. He continues to serve as President and CEO.

Eagle Eye Networks

In July 2012, Drako founded Eagle Eye Networks, a cloud-based video security company, and serves as its CEO.

In January 2014, Drako formally launched Eagle Eye Networks and introduced its cloud-managed video surveillance system. Eagle Eye’s goal was “to do for video surveillance what Dropbox did for file sharing by making video more available and far easier to use.”  Drako has been credited with establishing the concept of ‘true cloud’ in the physical security industry, to emphasize the differences between applications designed specifically for the cloud and legacy-design applications being run on a cloud-hosted virtual server.

In 2019 Eagle Eye Networks ranked #133 on the Deloitte Technology Fast 500 list of fastest growing technology companies in North America, with 936% growth from 2015 to 2018. In 2020, Eagle Eye Networks ranked #187 on the Deloitte Technology Fast 500 list, with 652% growth from 2016 to 2019.

In 2021, Eagle Eye Networks acquired artificial intelligence company Uncanny Vision, with a stated goal to accelerate delivering practical AI-based analytics to businesses. In 2022, Eagle Eye announced AI video search enabling customers to type in descriptions and then narrow results down by date, time, location, or camera.

Brivo
Drako acquired Brivo, a provider of cloud-based physical access control systems, in June 2015, and is serving as Brivo's Chairman. Brivo will sell its cloud-based access control systems along with Eagle Eye’s cloud-based security camera system, although the companies will continue to operate as separate entities.  In March 2020, Brivo announced that it acquired Parakeet as part of its expansion into smart buildings.  In November 2022, Brivo closed long-term senior secured credit facility of $75 million with Runway Growth Capital.

Drako Motors

Drako is co-founder and CEO of Drako Motors, an electric sports car software platform provider, which on August 6, 2015 announced its first product, the Drako DriveOS, a single VCU (vehicle control unit) operating system which controls all four wheels independently.  In June 2019, Drako Motors pre-announced their Drako GTE electric quad-motor supercar, claiming speeds of up to 206 MPH and 1200 horsepower.     In August 2019, Drako Motors formally launched the all-electric production Drako GTE.  In November 2022, Drako Motors launched the Drako Dragon all-electric luxury SUV, with 2,000 HP and 200+ mph maximum speed, quad motor powertrain, and two gullwing doors.

LivingTree

In December 2016, Drako acquired LivingTree, a K-12 family engagement platform provider. The acquisition was described as a "multimillion-dollar investment."  LivingTree provides a secure, community-wide platform for educators and parents to engage, independent of language preference, and is stated to address directives set by the Every Student Succeeds Act.

Swift Sensors

Drako founded Swift Sensors, a cloud-based wireless sensor company, in May 2015. In Dec 2016, Drako formally launched Swift Sensors and introduced its cloud wireless sensor system. Swift Sensors’ goal is to eliminate the pain and cost of Internet of Things sensing applications by offering a unified solution that requires no programming skills or technical expertise. Drako will serve as the company's Executive Chairman.

PermRecord and Permanent Legacy Foundation
In 2015, Drako created the PermRecord Foundation with the stated purpose "to ensure the preservation of materials placed in its trust."  This foundation contracted out to a commercial company, Permrecord, Inc., also founded by Drako, for its programming services.  By 2019 this mission had evolved "to preserve and provide perpetual access to the digital legacy of all people for the historical and educational benefit of future generations."  The foundation claims public charity status, but its public support percentage is zero, and it is completely controlled by its sole member (Dean Drako).  The foundation does not appear to have any perpetual means to accomplish its mission, subsisting on occasional grants from Drako.  The foundation's website hides its legal name and charity registration number under a "Brand Assets" page, but refers to itself under the DBA "Permanent Legacy Foundation".  Its home page promises "We invest your contributions into a nonprofit endowment" but there is no record of that endowment in its public accounting records.

Awards and recognition

In 1984, Drako won finalist in the Westinghouse Science Talent Search for his solar energy research.

In 2007, Drako was named Entrepreneur of the Year for Northern California for Networking and Communications by Ernst & Young.

In 2011, during Drako's tenure as CEO, Barracuda Networks was ranked #2 of the 2011 Best Tech Co's to Work For in 2011 by Business Insider.

In 2012, Drako was elected to the Board of  Directors of the Electronic Design Automation Consortium board.

Since 2012 Drako has served on the University of Michigan Advisory council. 

In 2014, Drako was selected as Keynote speaker for UC Berkeley Engineering Week, where he reviewed his 5 principles of entrepreneurship. During the keynote, he stated his favorite business principle was keeping customers happy.

In 2014, Goldman Sachs named Dean Drako as one of the 100 Most Intriguing Entrepreneurs of 2014.

In 2016, Dean was commencement speaker at University of Michigan Engineering School.

In 2022, Drako was named Entrepreneur of the Year regional finalist by Ernst & Young.

References

Living people
American technology company founders
Businesspeople in software
University of Michigan College of Engineering alumni
Year of birth missing (living people)
American technology chief executives
UC Berkeley College of Engineering alumni